Maria Louise Clara Albertine Fluitsma (born 12 December 1946), known as Marlous Fluitsma, is a Dutch actress, known for her roles in Dutch films and on television in various Dutch language series. She was well-known to Europeans outside the Netherlands for hosting the Eurovision Song Contest 1980, held in The Hague.

Early life
Fluitsma grew up in Nijmegen where her father was a teacher. After her studies at the Stage Acting Academy in Maastricht, she played for the Groot Limburgs Toneel (the largest acting group in Limburg province) and for the Haagse Comedie (The Hague Comedy Group).

Career credits
She became better known when she played the lead role in a play written by Herman van Veen: De Spinse (1973). She appeared in the movies Uit elkaar (1979) and Ik ben Joep Meloen (1981), as well as the television series Pommetje Horlepiep (1976) and De Fabriek (1981). On 19 April 1980, Fluitsma presented the Eurovision Song Contest in the Congresgebouw in The Hague.

From 1990 until the end of 1991, she played "Helen Helmink" in the soap opera Goede tijden, slechte tijden. When she indicated she wanted to spend more time with her family, she was replaced by Bruni Heinke. It was the first time a recast had ever happened in Dutch soap opera. While on Goede tijden, slechte tijden, she played Eliza Zadelhof on the series Diamant (1990) and also appeared in Ernstige Delicten.

Personal life
From her previous marriage to Herman van Veen she has two children, Merlijn and Anne. Fluitsma currently lives in Soest.

See also
 List of Eurovision Song Contest presenters

External links

1946 births
Living people
Dutch film actresses
Dutch television actresses
People from Zutphen
Dutch soap opera actresses
People from Soest, Netherlands